The following is a list of the 285 communes of the Aveyron department of France. Out of the land area is being , and the percentage of the department's land area is just 34 per cent of its land area of an average commune.

The communes cooperate in the following intercommunalities (as of 2020):
Communauté d'agglomération Rodez Agglomération
Communauté de communes Aubrac, Carladez et Viadène
Communauté de communes Aveyron Bas Ségala Viaur
Communauté de communes des Causses à l'Aubrac
Communauté de communes Comtal Lot et Truyère
Communauté de communes Conques-Marcillac
Communauté de communes Decazeville Communauté
Communauté de communes Grand-Figeac (partly)
Communauté de communes Larzac et Vallées
Communauté de communes de Lévézou Pareloup
Communauté de communes de Millau Grands Causses (partly)
Communauté de communes Monts, Rance et Rougier
Communauté de communes de la Muse et des Raspes du Tarn
Communauté de communes Ouest Aveyron Communauté (partly)
Communauté de communes du Pays Rignacois
Communauté de communes du Pays de Salars
Communauté de communes Pays Ségali
Communauté de communes du Plateau de Montbazens
Communauté de communes du Réquistanais
Communauté de communes Saint Affricain, Roquefort, Sept Vallons

References

Aveyron